Rail transport can be found in every theme park resort property owned or licensed by Disney Parks, Experiences and Products, one of the four business segments of the Walt Disney Company. The origins of Disney theme park rail transport can be traced back to Walt Disney himself and his personal fondness for railroads, who insisted that they be included in the first Disney park, the original Disneyland (a key component of the Disneyland Resort) in California in the United States, which opened on July 17, 1955. The Disney tradition of including transport by rail in, and adjacent to, its parks has since been extended to other Disney properties with the opening of Walt Disney World in Florida in the United States, Tokyo Disney Resort in Japan, Disneyland Paris in France, Hong Kong Disneyland Resort in China, and Shanghai Disney Resort in China. The Disney theme park chain is the largest on the planet by annual attendance with over 155 million visitors in 2019, and the rail systems located inside its properties play key roles as modes of transportation and as attractions for its visitors.

Each Disney theme park resort has a rail transport system serving its general resort area, whether it is a monorail system located inside the Disney resort properties in the United States and Japan, or a conventional rail system connecting external rail networks to the Disney resorts in France and China. The Disneyland Monorail System in California was the first monorail system in the United States; the Walt Disney World Monorail System in Florida, with an estimated 150,000 passengers per day, is one of the busiest monorail systems in the world. Both Disney park resort properties in the United States, as well as those in Japan and France, contain theme parks that feature genuine steam-powered railroads. The Disney park chain has one of the world's largest private collections of operational steam locomotives, with seventeen in total spread across the globe. Additional rail systems within the theme parks in both United States resorts and the Hong Kong resort resemble steam-powered railroads, but their locomotives are powered by internal combustion engines. Other rail transport modes found in Disney parks include horse-drawn streetcar rail lines within both resorts in the United States and the resort in France, replica vintage electric rail lines in California and Japan, and a people mover in Florida.

Disneyland Resort

Route diagrams

Walt Disney World

Route diagrams

Tokyo Disney Resort

Route diagrams

Disneyland Paris

Route diagrams

Hong Kong Disneyland Resort

Route diagrams

Shanghai Disney Resort

See also
Large amusement railways
Narrow-gauge railway

Other similar railroads:

Weiser Railroad (opened 1929) in The Henry Ford (Greenfield Village)
Edaville Railroad (opened 1947) in Edaville Family Theme Park
Ghost Town & Calico Railroad (opened 1952) in Knott's Berry Farm
Tweetsie Railroad (opened 1957)
White Mountain Central Railroad (opened 1958) in Clark's Bears
Dollywood Express (opened 1961) in Dollywood
Six Flags & Texas Railroad (opened 1961) in Six Flags Over Texas
Frisco Silver Dollar Line (opened 1962) in Silver Dollar City
Cedar Point & Lake Erie Railroad (opened 1963) in Cedar Point
Efteling Steam Train Company (opened 1969) in Efteling

Museums and private railroads with rolling stock previously run on Disney property:
Justi Creek Railway
Los Angeles Live Steamers Railroad Museum
Pacific Coast Railroad
Santa Rosa Valley Railroad
Southern California Railway Museum

References

Bibliography

External links

 (Disney Parks)

 
Amusement rides based on rail transport
Heritage railways
Heritage streetcar systems
Horse-drawn railways
Monorails
Narrow gauge railways
People movers
Standard gauge railways
Tram transport